Antonsson is a surname of Swedish origin. Among Icelandic names, Antonsson is a patronymic name meaning son of Anton. It derived from the Antonius root name. The name may refer to:

Bertil Antonsson (1921–2006), Swedish Olympic wrestler
Daniel Antonsson (contemporary), Swedish guitarist and songwriter
Jan-Eric Antonsson (contemporary), Swedish Olympic badminton player
Johannes Antonsson (1921–1995), Swedish politician; government minister and provincial governor
Markús Örn Antonsson (b. 1943), Icelandic politician; Mayor of Reykjavík 1991–94
Mikael Antonsson (b. 1981), Swedish professional football player playing for FC Copenhagen
Marcus Antonsson (b. 1991), Swedish professional football player playing for Leeds United

See also

Antonson

References

Patronymic surnames
Swedish-language surnames
Surnames from given names